Jiju Asokan (born May 18, 1977) is an Indian film director and Scriptwriter best known for his work in Malayalam cinema.

Personal life
Jiju Asokan was born in Padiyur, Kerala with Asokan E.k and Valsala Asokan as his parents. Jiju Asokan completed his education at the SNVLP School, Padiyur and HDPHSS Edathirinji, and earned a degree from Christ College, Irinjalakuda and St. Theresa's kottakkal.

Career
Jiju Asokan started his writing career writing and publishing many short stories in Mathrubhumi “Balapangthi”. He made his debut as scriptwriter of the film Oridathoru Puzhayundu which won the Kerala State Film Award in 2007. His next project was Malayalam film Shakespeare M.A. Malayalam.

He was worked as an assistant director with Malayalam film director Jijo Appachan and made his debut as a director with the film Last Bench, which participated in the film marketing workshop of 10th international film festival of kerala. Jiju's second directorial venture Urumbukal Urangarilla was released in 2015. His third movie Premasoothram (2018) released in May 2018.

Filmography

References

External links

1977 births
Living people